The Men's sprint competition at the 2022 UCI Track Cycling World Championships was held on 15 and 16 October 2022.

Results

Qualifying
The qualifying was started on 15 October at 12:30. The top four riders advanced directly to the 1/8 finals; places 5 to 28 advanced to the 1/16 final.

1/16 finals
The 1/16 finals were started on 15 October at 13:40.

1/8 finals
The 1/8 finals were started on 15 October at 15:21.

Quarterfinals
The quarterfinals were started on 15 October at 17:52.

Semifinals
The semifinals were started on 16 October at 17:52.

Finals
The finals were started on 16 October at 14:07.

References

Men's sprint